"Summerlove Sensation" is a song originally recorded by the Bay City Rollers. It was part of their 1974 album Rollin'. In the same year it was also released as a single. The single peaked at no. 3 on the UK Singles Chart.

Charts

Sylvie Vartan version (in French) 

The song was later reworked into French under the title "Petit rainbow". It was recorded by Sylvie Vartan and released in 1977 as a single. In France her version of the song spent one week at no. 1 on the singles sales chart (from 7 to 13 October 1977).

Track listing 
7" single (1977, France etc.)
 A. "Petit rainbow" ("Summer Love Sensation") (3:33)
 B. "Bla bla bla" (2:46)

Charts

Other versions
Bobby Vinton covered "Summerlove, Sensation" in 1978.  His version reached #44 on the U.S. Billboard Easy Listening chart during the summer of that year.

References 

Bay City Rollers songs
Sylvie Vartan songs
1974 songs
1974 singles
1977 singles
1978 singles
Bell Records singles
RCA Victor singles
Elektra Records singles
Songs written by Phil Coulter
Songs written by Bill Martin (songwriter)